Maden may refer to:

Places in Turkey
 Maden, Elazığ, a town and district in Elazığ Province
 Maden, Bayburt, a village of Bayvurt Province
 Maden, Şavşat, a village in Artvin Province

Other uses
 Maden (film), a 1978 Turkish film
 Maden language, an Austronesian language spoken in West Papua

People with the name
 Bishnu Maden (died 2003), Nepalese politician
 John Maden (1862–1920), British Liberal Party politician
 Henry Maden (1892–1960), English barrister and Liberal politician
 Richard Maden (born 1972), English swimmer
 Steve Maden (born 1982), English rugby league footballer
 Yannick Maden (born 1989), German tennis player
 Tom Maden, American actor

See also 
 Maiden (disambiguation)
 Madden (disambiguation)
 Madin (disambiguation)